The Tirupati Urban Development Authority, also known as TUDA is a government agency and the principal planning authority  for Tirupati and its neighbourhood areas in Tirupati District of the Indian state of Andhra pradesh. It was notified on 6 November 1981 by the Government of Andhra Pradesh as per Andhra Pradesh Urban Areas Development Act 1975 and is headquartered at Tirupati.

References 

Tirupati
State urban development authorities of India
Urban development authorities of Andhra Pradesh